Cinematronics, LLC, later known as Maxis South, was a Texas-based developer of games for the PC and Mac, founded in 1994 by David Stafford, Mike Sandige and Kevin Gliner. They developed Tritryst for Virgin Interactive, Full Tilt! Pinball for Maxis, and Jack Nicklaus 4 for Accolade. The Space Cadet pinball table from Full Tilt! was also included with Microsoft Plus 95 and several versions of Microsoft Windows. Maxis bought the company in 1996 and renamed it Maxis South; at the time there were 13 employees. As Maxis South, they developed games such as Marble Drop and an unreleased Diablo-type game called Crucible. The studio was closed and the employees were laid off when Maxis was acquired by Electronic Arts in 1997. Crucible, Remnants, and Nightfall - three titles in development from Maxis South have been canceled as a result.

References

Video game companies of the United States
Maxis